n-Propyl iodide (also 1-propyl iodide or 1-iodopropane) is a colorless, flammable chemical compound. It has the chemical formula C3H7I and is prepared by heating n-propyl alcohol with iodine and phosphorus.

References

Iodoalkanes
Propyl compounds